The men's eight competition at the 2022 World Rowing Championships took place at the Račice regatta venue.

Schedule
The schedule was as follows:

All times are Central European Summer Time (UTC+2)

Results

Heats
The fastest boat in each heat advanced directly to the final A. The remaining boats were sent to the repechages.

Heat 1

Heat 2

Repechages
The two fastest boats in each heat advanced directly to the final A. The remaining boats were sent to the final B.

Repechage 1

Repechage 2

Finals
The A final determined the rankings for places 1 to 6. Additional rankings were determined in the other finals

Final B

Final A

References

2022 World Rowing Championships